In God We Trust is a play written by Avaes Mohammad. It is set in Guantanamo Bay detention camp and uses this environment to explore ideas of American imperialism as well as philosophical divisions within Islam through its central characters, Sarfraz and Hamza.

Original tour

The piece was toured by Peshkar Productions to the following venues in 2005:
 Lawrence Batley Theatre; 1 and 2 March
 Hawth Theatre, Crawley; 4 and 5 March
 Gateway Theatre (Chester); 10–12 March
 Oldham Coliseum Theatre; 7–9 April
 Octagon Theatre, Bolton; 12 and 13 April
 Contact Theatre; 18–21 April
 The Drum (Arts Centre); 22 and 23 April
 Darlington Arts Centre; 26 April
 Theatre in the Mill, Bradford; 29 and 30 April

Cast

The cast for the play included Gary Stoner, as Hamza, Asif Khan, as Sarfraz and Roxy Shahidi playing a prison guard.

References

2005 plays
British plays
English plays